Moeris may refer to:

 Moeris (skipper), a genus of butterflies in the grass skipper family
 Lake Moeris, an ancient lake of Egypt
 Amenemhat III (c. 1860–1814 BC), Twelfth Dynasty pharaoh who reportedly dug the lake
 Lacus Moeris, a surface feature on Mars
 Aelius Moeris (fl. 2nd century), Greek grammarian